Sholay (Embers) is a 1984 Pakistani musical action film, directed by Yunus Malik and produced by Ejaz Durrani. It stars Sultan Rahi, Mustafa Qureshi and Ilyas Kashmiri in lead roles.

Cast
 Anjuman – as Gori
 Sultan Rahi – as Haidar
 Ejaz Durrani – as Asghar
 Mustafa Qureshi – as Dara
 Bahar – as Malka-E- Jazbat
 Rafi Khawar – as Maula Bukhsh
 Afzaal Ahmed – as Master Allah Bukhsh
 Altaf Khan – as son Jageerdar
 Iqbal Durrani – as son Jageerdar
 Ilyas Kashmiri – as Jageerdar Kadar Khan
 Khalifa Nazir
 Abid Kashmiri
 Imdad Hussaini
 Jaggi Malik
 Zahir Shah
 Anwar Khan
 Sawan
 Changezi

Soundtrack
The music of the film is by the musician Wajahat Attre. The song lyrics were penned by Khawaja Pervez and Waris Ludhianvi. The playback singers are:
 Noor Jehan
 Masood Rana

References

External links
 
 Sholay on Complete Index To World Film (CITWF) website

Pakistani action films
Pakistani crime films
1984 films
Punjabi-language Pakistani films
1980s Punjabi-language films